Gemma Teresa Guerrero Cruz-Araneta (born 30 September 1943) is a Filipino politician, writer, director, and beauty queen who won Miss International 1964, becoming the first Filipino and Asian to win the title. She received an "Outstanding Manileña" and a "Golden Heart" Presidential decoration from the former Philippine President Diosdado Macapagal.

Heritage
Araneta's paternal great-grandmother was Doña Maria Mercado, the sister of the Philippines' national hero, José Rizal.
Her mother is writer and journalist Carmen Guerrero Nakpil, her maternal uncle is writer and diplomat León María Guerrero III, and her great-great-grandfather is revolutionary leader, distinguished botanist and pharmacist León María Guerrero y Leogardo.

Rise to fame
She earned the right to represent the country at Miss International 1964 contest by winning the Miss Philippines 1964 pageant, sponsored by the City of Manila. She donated the US$10,000 prize money to the Manila Boys Town and Girls Home, a home for indigent and out of school youth in Marikina. This led the Congress to pass a resolution to exempt her from paying taxes.

Career

Araneta first entered public service in 1968 when President Ferdinand Marcos appointed her Director of the National Museum. She was concurrently a member of the National Historical Commission of the Philippines. She was appointed Secretary of Tourism by President Joseph Estrada, a position she held from 30 June 1998 to 20 January 2001. She resumed her writing career in 2001 and has now a bi-weekly column editorial section in the Manila Bulletin.

In 2003, she was elected director/trustee and president of the Heritage Conservation Society of the Philippines and was re-elected in February 2006.

On 16 May 2005, Araneta started hosting a daily radio programme, Krus Na Daan (Filipino for "Crossroads") on DZRJ 810 and a weekly television show, Only Gemma! on Rajah Broadcasting Network.

To date, Araneta has authored and co-authored seven books on Philippine history and other related topics, namely: 
 Makisig, the Little Hero of Mactan
 Hanoi Diary: Beauty and Fashion for the Filipina (co-author)
 Sentimiento: Fiction and Nostagia
 Katha at Salamisim
 El Galeón de Manila: Un Mar de Historias (co-author)
 Stones of Faith
 Rizal's True Love

In April 2010, Araneta was named as one of the members of the Board of Regents of the Pamantasan ng Lungsod ng Maynila.

Personal life
Araneta is married to Antonio "Tonypet" Araneta and they have two children, Fatimah and Leon.

References

1943 births
Living people
Miss International winners
Araneta family
Writers from Manila
Secretaries of Tourism of the Philippines
Miss International 1964 delegates
Filipino beauty pageant winners
20th-century Filipino historians
Estrada administration cabinet members
Gemma
Manila Bulletin people
Women members of the Cabinet of the Philippines
Filipino women historians